Bengkunat is a village and kecamatan (sub-district) of the West Lampung Regency (Lampung Barat) in Lampung province in far south-western Sumatra. It is connected by road directly to the provincial capital of Bandar Lampung in the east. It lies near the coast and what is known as Bengkunat Bay, located about 7 miles southeast of Ujung Siging. A massif is formed in this area, the Bengkunat massif, noted for its granite.

References

Populated places in Lampung